Chris Noel (Sandra Louise Noel, born July 2, 1941) is a retired American actress and entertainer. Noel is best known for her appearances in beach party movies in the 1960s, and for her work on the Armed Forces Radio And Television Service as the "Voice of Vietnam". A popular pin-up girl of the era, Noel made frequent visits to troops, and was at risk many times, having twice been shot down in the helicopters she was riding. She hosted the radio program A Date With Chris, one of Armed Forces Radio's most popular shows.

Model
Noel's picture appeared on the cover of Good Housekeeping magazine when she was 16 years old, and she was painted as a pin-up model by Gil Elvgren. Won the Miss Palm Beach pageant. After moving to New York City, she became a cheerleader for the New York Giants football team. Posters that showed her holding a Kodak Brownie camera were displayed in camera stores. She also had her own modeling school in Lake Park, Florida. Noel was the cover girl for a number of magazines and appeared in advertising for Ford Mustang and other products.

Vietnam
In addition to her work on radio during the Vietnam War, she toured the country eight times, including twice with Bob Hope's USO tours. Her interest in that war's military personnel began with her visit to a San Francisco VA hospital in 1965. At the VA hospital, she sang the song Diamonds Are a Girl's Best Friend and talk to the Vets. She said, "That was the moment. I prayed to God to help me help young men in war. She was considered so valuable to American military morale, that the enemy placed a $10,000 bounty on her. Noel opened the show with the greeting "Hi, Love". Twice her chopper was downed by enemy fire while she was visiting American military personnel in Vietnam. Her radio show A Date with Chris was recorded in California and South Vietnam between 1966 and 1971 for the Armed Forces Radio heard on 300 stations around the world. Noel was the DJ for her show and did interviews with artists including Ray Charles, Lawrence Welk, Robert Mitchum, Marvin Gaye, Nancy Sinatra and others. Noel received the Distinguished Vietnam Veteran award in 1984 from the Veterans Network for her work during the war. Her last visit to South Vietnam was in 1969. Noel first co-hosted an Armed Forces Radio show called Small World, which was a hit and led to her own show. She was dating singer Jack Jones at the time. Noel sang, danced, read poetry, signed autographs, talk to, kissed and hugged the troops in South Vietnam from 1966 to 1970. She is the only female to travel through South Vietnam to remote bases in helicopters, riding with the door open, next to the gunner. She survived mortar and assault rifle attacks in war zones. Noel broadcast her radio show from Saigon while in South Vietnam. She also made a number of visits troops at the Korean Demilitarized Zone, some with Betty Waldron and Bill Thrasher.

Singer
In the early 1970s, Noel was in New York and was working with Paul Colby, impresario and owner of the famous Greenwich Village club, The Bitter End. She was performing cover songs by John Prine and needed a backup band, so Colby asked Dennis Lepri, who had worked with Kenny Rogers and Gunhill Road, to form a band for her and produce her sound. After auditioning many New York area musicians, the band "Quilt" was formed. After extensive rehearsals at the Bitter End, the band showcased for selected industry executives to mixed reviews. Sometime after, the band was dissolved and Noel pursued other interests. In 1999 she released the CD Nashville Impact.

Personal life
Following his proposal in a helicopter, Noel wed soldier Green Beret captain Ty Herrington, whom she later found out was diagnosed as a "paranoid schizophrenic manic-depressive". He killed himself in December 1969 after they had been married for 11 months. She went on to marry three more times, once to a Texan independent oil producer, another to a guy she met in church, and last to a lawyer. Noel also has written books, her latest book is about filming Cease Fire with Don Johnson. Another book is a 1987 book called Matter of Survival: The "War" Jane Never Saw and the 2011 book, Vietnam And Me her personal memoir of the war. In the 1960s her best friend was Eileen O’Neill and she dated Chad Everett. Chris Noel was asked and attended the dedication of the Vietnam Veterans Memorial in Washington DC in 1982.  Noel and Captain Ty Herrington, (Clyde Berkley) born July 2, 1941, were married on January 11, 1969 in Miami. Ty Herrington released a 45 RPM promo single, with the songs: A Gun Don't Make A Man written by Boudleaux & Felice Bryant and When The Green Berets Come Home written by Boudleaux Bryant in 1968.

“I didn't know how many people were going to remember me,” she said. “But everywhere I went veterans came up to me and thanked me. It felt like I was right back in Vietnam again.”

Noel founded the Women's Interactive Network in 1985 to help women with Post-traumatic stress disorder. In 1993, she opened a shelter in Boynton Beach, Florida, providing space for 10–12 drug-free veterans at a time. In 2019 she received Amvets Silver Helmet Award.

In 2004 a DVD documentary of her life was released Blonde Bombshell: The Incredible True Story of Chris Noel.

In May 2022 Noel was Awarded the Heroes Honor Lifetime Award at the Heroes Honor Festival.

Los Angeles Veterans Hospital
When a group of veterans went on a hunger strike in 1981 at the Los Angeles Veterans Hospital to get better treatment, the Reagan administration asked Noel to act as an intermediary with the veterans. Noel helped negotiate an end to the hunger strike.

Presidential Medal of Freedom
Because of her lifelong work with troops and veterans, as well as for being shot down in an army helicopter twice over South Vietnam, which with surviving assault attacks in the war caused post-traumatic stress disorder, the Vietnam Veterans of America joined with other groups and individuals to petition for Chris Noel to be awarded the Presidential Medal of Freedom.

Film and TV

Noel began acting started in 1963 on stage in the Broadway play Mister Roberts with Hugh O'Brian, her boyfriend at the time. Also in the Mister Roberts play was Will Hutchins, Vincent Gardenia, Tony Mordente, Alan Yorke, Vince O'Brien, Bill Fletcher, John J. Martin, directed by Billy Matthews. Noel acting in film started with a role in Soldier in the Rain, with Steve McQueen and included working with Elvis Presley in Girl Happy. She also was in Beach Ball with Edd Byrnes, and Cease Fire with Don Johnson.

Filmography

Film

Television

Books
Books by Chris Noel:
Matter of Survival: The "War" Jane Never Saw
Vietnam And Me, Noel's personal memoir of the war
Confessions Of A Pin-Up Girl: The Hollywood Sex Symbol Who Became A Vietnam Icon
Filming Cease Fire
Filming Happy Girls
Filming Soldier in the Rain
Filming The Glory Stompers
Filming Beach Ball
Filming College Girl
Filming For Singles Only
Filming Wild Times
Filming Joy in the Morning
Filming Bewitched Love Is Blind: Behind the Scenes with Liz Montgomery and Dick York
DVD documentary Blonde Bombshell: The Incredible True Story of Chris Noel

Broadway
1963, Mister Roberts, Directed by Billy Matthews, Hugh O'Brian leading role.

Music
 Doll House B side: Mr. and Mrs. Smith - 1968 Single Promo 
 Forgotten Man - 1982 Album - Dedicated to Vietnam Veterans 
 Nashville Impact – 1999 Album 
 ...Next Stop Is Vietnam, The War on Record: 1961-2008 Introduction To "A Date With Chris" - 2010 Album.

See also

List of entertainers who performed for American troops in Vietnam
Lee Hansen
Adrian Cronauer
Patty Thomas

References

External links
youtube.com, Chris Noel, The Voice of Vietnam
youtube.com Chris Radio in Vietnam
American Forces Radio Vietnam,A Date With Chris 

Chris Noel, AFRTS Archive

Living people
20th-century American actresses
American film actresses
American television actresses
American cheerleaders
American women in the Vietnam War
National Football League cheerleaders
Chris Noel
1941 births
21st-century American women writers
American radio DJs
American women radio presenters
Female models from Florida
American female models
20th-century American singers
20th-century American women singers
Women DJs
United Service Organizations entertainers